Bayramnyýaz Berdiýew (born 13 September 1974) is a Turkmen football coach and a former player who played as a goalkeeper.

Club career 
Berdiýew made his senior football debut in the last season of the USSR Championship, playing in the 1991 Soviet Second League for FC Kopetdag and in the 1991 Soviet Second League B for FC Ahal.

After Turkmenistan gained independence, he continued to play for the clubs of the Ýokary Liga, including FC Turan Dashoguz, Nisa Aşgabat and again for FC Kopetdag. He became the champion and medalist of the national championship.

In 2001, he moved to the Kazakhstani Esil Bogatyr, where he spent three and a half seasons. In the first three he was the main goalkeeper. Bronze medalist of the 2001 Kazakhstan Premier League, he conceded only 11 goals in 25 matches that season. In total, he played 76 matches for the Kazakh club in the Kazakhstan Premier League and 9 in the Kazakhstan Cup.

Berdiýew again played in Turkmenistan and briefly moved to the Kazakhstani FC Ordabasy, where he played one match in the Kazakhstan Premier League and two games in the Kazakhstan Cup.

In the second half of the 2000s, he played in Uzbekistan: in 2006-2007 he was the main goalkeeper of FC Qizilqum Zarafshon, and also played for Shurtan and Navbahor.

In the 2004 Ýokary Liga he became the champion with the Nebitçi FT and in 2008 Ýokary Liga with FC Aşgabat. In 2008, in the Turkmenisatn SuperCup match against Şagadam FK, he saved three penalties and scored the decisive goal in the post-match series.

International career 
Since 2000, Berdiýew has played for the Turkmenistan national football team. His debut took place on October 8, 2000 against Uzbekistan, replacing Alexander Korobko in the 84th minute.

Baýramnyýaz Berdiýew participated in the 2004 Asian Cup in China, where he was the third goalkeeper and never entered the field.

He became a finalist in the 2010 AFC Challenge Cup, having played all five matches in the tournament. In total, he played 28 matches for the national team.

Coaching career 
In 2017–2020, he worked as a goalkeeper coach at the FC Ahal. In some matches, he acted as head coach.

At the end of the 2019 season, after the resignation of Amangylyç Koçumow, he acted as head coach. Under his leadership the club was a finalist in the Turkmenistan Cup.

Honours

Club
Nisa Aşgabat
 Ýokary Liga: 1998–99
 Turkmenistan Cup: 1995, 1998

Nebitçi FT
 Ýokary Liga: 2004
 Turkmenistan Cup: 2004

International
AFC Challenge Cup
Runners-up: 2010

References

External links
 

1974 births
Living people
Turkmenistan footballers
Turkmenistan international footballers
2004 AFC Asian Cup players
Expatriate footballers in Kazakhstan
FK Köpetdag Aşgabat players
FC Aşgabat players
FC Nisa Aşgabat players
FC Kyzylzhar players
FC Shurtan Guzar players
FC Ordabasy players
navbahor Namangan players
Turkmenistan expatriate sportspeople in Kazakhstan
Turkmenistan expatriate footballers
Association football goalkeepers